Joseph Lister Hill (December 29, 1894 – December 20, 1984) was an American politician. A member of the Democratic Party, he represented Alabama in the U.S. Congress for more than forty-five years, as both a U.S. Representative (1923–1938) and a U.S. Senator (1938–1969). During his Senate career he was active on health-related issues, and served as Senate Majority Whip (1941–47), and Hill also served as the Chair of the Senate Labor Committee. At the time of his retirement, Hill was the fourth-most senior Senator. Hill was succeeded by fellow Democrat James Allen.

Early years
Hill was born in Montgomery, Alabama, on December 29, 1894, the son of one of the South's most distinguished surgeons, Dr. Luther Leonidas Hill Jr. He was named after Dr. Joseph Lister, the father of antiseptic surgery. Following his graduation from the Starke University School in Montgomery, he entered the University of Alabama at the age of sixteen and graduated four years later with a BA and law degree and a Phi Beta Kappa key. While a student at the University of Alabama, he was a member of Delta Kappa Epsilon. He also founded the Student Government Association (SGA) and was its first president, the Jasons Senior Men's Honorary (which the University ceased recognizing in 1976 for its all-male policy, but which still taps forty men each spring on the Franklin Mound), and The Machine (the local chapter of Theta Nu Epsilon).

He also studied law at the University of Michigan Law School at Ann Arbor, Michigan, and at Columbia Law School in New York City. He was admitted to the Alabama bar in 1916 and commenced practice in Montgomery and also served as the president of the Montgomery Board of Education from 1917 to 1922.

Political life
Hill was elected on August 14, 1923, as U.S. representative  from Alabama's 2nd congressional district to fill the vacancy created by the death of John R. Tyson. He served as Chairman of the House Committee on Military Affairs. On January 10, 1938, Hill was appointed to the U.S. Senate to fill the vacancy caused by the resignation of Senator Dixie Graves for the term ending January 3, 1939.  Hill was subsequently elected to the Senate as a Democrat on April 26, 1938. During World War II Hill supported the interventionist side of America's foreign policy arguments and took an outspokenly "pro-British" stance, both speaking and voting in favor of the Lend-Lease program. On October 23 of 1941 he voted in favor of supplemental lend-lease funding to help the British Army. On November 7 of 1941 he voted in favor of legislation to amend several sections of the neutrality acts which was intended to make it easier for the United States to provide direct military aid to the United Kingdom during World War II. The British privately described him as "reliably pro-British." He was reelected in 1944, 1950, 1956, and 1962. He retired in January 1969.
 
A moderate-to-liberal populist Democrat, Hill distinguished himself in a number of fields, but was best known for the Hospital and Health Center Construction Act of 1946, better known as the Hill-Burton Act. He also sponsored the Hill-Harris Act of 1963, providing for assistance in constructing facilities for the intellectually disabled and mentally ill. Additionally, he was recognized as the most instrumental man in Congress in gaining greatly increased support for medical research at the nation's medical schools and other research institution.

He sponsored other important legislation, including the Rural Telephone Act, the Rural Housing Act, the Vocational Education Act, and the National Defense Education Act of 1958. "Hill also used his position and his persistence in improving conditions in rural areas to allot federal funds for rural libraries. For a decade, he worked to provide library service to those with no or inadequate facilities" and was instrumental in passing the Library Services Act which ensured federal funding to support development of libraries in rural areas and dramatically changed the landscape of libraries in terms of viability, sustainability, and quality.

In 1954, Hill signed "The Southern Manifesto" condemning the Supreme Court's 9–0 decision in Brown vs Board of Education ordering school desegregation, but remained a close friend of Supreme Court Justice and fellow Alabamian Hugo Black who voted for the decision. In 1957, he voted against the Civil Rights Act of 1957. He also voted against the Civil Rights Act of 1964.

However, Hill was as much a national figure as a representative of Alabama and the South. During his long years in the Congress, he would, from time to time, break with his southern colleagues to follow his own conscience. For example, in opposition to most southerners in the Congress, he favored federal control of offshore oil, with revenue to be earmarked for education.

Hill was the Senate Majority Whip from 1941 to 1947. He was Chairman of the Senate Labor and Public Welfare Committee, which handled important legislation on veterans education, health, hospitals, libraries, and labor-management relations. He was a ranking member of the Senate Appropriations Committee, and a member of the Senate Democratic Policy Committee.

In the 1950s, Hill criticized US President Dwight Eisenhower's attempts to reduce hospital funding that had been granted under the Hill-Burton Act. Hill strongly supported rural electrification and federally subsidized freight rates.

On September 4, 1964, President Lyndon B. Johnson signed the Nurse Training Act of 1964, noting Hill for both his efforts in pioneering the legislation and his absence during the ceremony.

1962 campaign

In 1962, Hill sought his last term in office but faced an unusually strong Republican opponent in James D. Martin, a petroleum products distributor from Gadsden. Like Hill, Martin supported the Tennessee Valley Authority, a New Deal project begun in 1933. Martin noted that the original sponsor of the interstate development agency was a Republican US Senator, George W. Norris of Nebraska. Martin proposed in the campaign the TVA headquarters to be relocated from Knoxville, Tennessee, to its original point of development, Muscle Shoals, Alabama. Hill had worked to fund other public works projects too, including the deepening of the Mobile Ship Channel, the building of the Gainesville Lock and Dam in Sumter County, and the Tennessee-Tombigbee Waterway, an ultimately successful strategy to link the Tennessee River with the Gulf of Mexico. In the campaign against Martin, Hill said, "If Alabama is to continue the progress and development she has achieved, she cannot do so by deserting the great Democratic Party."
 
Hill pledged to seek renewed funding for the Redstone Arsenal and Marshall Space Flight Center in Huntsville, Alabama, and accused Eisenhower of having neglected the space program while the former Soviet Union was placing Sputnik into the atmosphere. Strongly endorsed by organized labor, Hill accused the Republicans of exploiting the South to enrich the North and the East and attacked the legacy of former President Herbert Hoover and the earlier "evils" of Reconstruction. Hill predicted that Alabama voters would bury the Republicans "under an avalanche."

The 1962 midterm elections were overshadowed by the Cuban Missile Crisis. Martin joined Hill in endorsing the quarantine of Cuba but insisted that the problem was an outgrowth of the failed Bay of Pigs Invasion of 1961. Hill said that Soviet premier Nikita S. Khrushchev had "chickened out" because "the one thing the communists respect is strength." The New York Times speculated that the blockade ordered by Kennedy may have spared Hill from defeat.

Despite the postwar bipartisan consensus for foreign aid, Martin hammered away at Hill's backing for such programs. He decried subsidies to foreign manufacturers and workers at the expense of Alabama's then large force of textile workers: "These foreign giveaways have cost taxpayers billions of dollars and turned many areas of Alabama into distressed areas." Martin also condemned aid to communist countries and the impact of the United Nations on national policy. He questioned Hill's congressional seniority as of little use when troops were dispatched in the fall of 1962 to compel the desegregation of the University of Mississippi.

The Hill-Martin race drew considerable national attention. The liberal columnist Drew Pearson wrote from Decatur, Alabama, that "for the first time since Reconstruction, the two-party system, which political scientists talk about for the South, but never expect to materialize, may come to Alabama."The New York Times viewed the Alabama race as the most vigorous off year effort in modern southern history but predicted a Hill victory on the basis that Martin had failed to gauge "bread-and-butter" issues and was perceived by many as an "ultraconservative." 
 
Hill defeated Martin by 6,019 votes, 201,937 (50.9 percent) to 195,134 (49.1 percent). Turnout dropped sharply in 1962 compared to 1960, when presidential electors dominated the ballot, and the state split between Kennedy-Johnson and unpledged electors who ultimately voted for U.S. Senator Harry F. Byrd, Sr., of Virginia. Nearly 250,000 who had voted in the 1960 U.S. Senate election won by the Democrat John Sparkman did not cast ballots in 1962. Hill won thirty-seven of the state's sixty-seven counties. Martin's strong showing enabled him to be elected in 1964 to Alabama's 7th congressional district seat in the House of Representatives.

Later life
In 1969, Hill was awarded the Public Welfare Medal from the National Academy of Sciences. He received honorary degrees from thirteen colleges and universities, including the University of Alabama and Auburn University. He was a Methodist, a Freemason, a United States Army veteran of World War I—having been assigned to the  Seventeenth and Seventy-first United States Infantry Regiments—and a member of the American Legion.

Hill retired from the Senate in 1969, and was succeeded by fellow Democrat James B. Allen of Gadsden, a former lieutenant governor and a leader of his state's conservative faction. Hill died in Montgomery on December 20, 1984, and is interred there at Greenwood Cemetery. Hill is the namesake of the small community of Listerhill, Alabama.

His great-grandson, Joseph Lister Hubbard, is a former member of the Alabama House of Representatives from District 73 in Montgomery, holding office between 2010 and 2014. He was also the Democratic nominee for Attorney General of Alabama in the 2014 elections.

References

External links

The Lister Hill National Center for Biomedical Communications at the National Institutes of Health, Bethesda, Maryland.
The Lister Hill Library of the Health Sciences at the University of Alabama at Birmingham.
Lister Hill article, Encyclopedia of Alabama

|-

|-

|-

|-

|-

|-

|-

1894 births
1984 deaths
20th-century American politicians
Columbia Law School alumni
Democratic Party members of the United States House of Representatives from Alabama
Democratic Party United States senators from Alabama
Politicians from Montgomery, Alabama
University of Alabama alumni
University of Michigan Law School alumni
Lawyers from Montgomery, Alabama
Left-wing populism in the United States
20th-century American lawyers
American segregationists